Sutton 58  (also known as 3 Sutton Place) is a residential skyscraper in the Sutton Place neighborhood of Midtown East, Manhattan in New York City.

Architecture 
It is variously cited as containing 62 stories or 65 stories. The site contains  of buildable space. 

The tower's stone-and-glass facade contains five bays of windows on its northern and southern elevations and three bays on the western and eastern elevations. The tower is slightly cantilevered over a neighboring building to the east. The superstructure is made of reinforced concrete.

History

Bauhouse plans 
In January 2015, The Bauhouse Group secured three adjacent low-rise buildings on the east side of Midtown Manhattan in New York City. That August, Bauhouse acquired another  of air rights for $37.9 million. Bauhouse obtained a $63 million loan from Gamma Real Estate in early 2015 and received another $147 million loan from Gamma that June. JLL brokered the loans.

The plans had generated opposition by mid-2015, and opponents raised money to fight the plans. At the time, the neighborhood had no height restrictions for new buildings, and developers needed only to assemble the required air rights. Residents of the neighboring 434 East 58th Street, whose air rights Bauhouse had purchased during late 2014 for $11 million, said they had been told the structure would be between 13 and 30 stories tall, only to then be shown the plans for a 90-story tower. According to a Bauhouse spokesperson, "As the complex assemblage continued into 2015, the size of the building increased." In the midst of opposition, Bauhouse executive Joseph Beninati sought a partner for the project, particularly one who could help underwrite the $650 million proposed cost. By December 2015, demolition permits had been filed for the site. A neighboring property owner, whose house abutted one of the buildings that was going to be demolished, claimed that the demolition would damage his house. 

In January 2016, Bauhouse defaulted on the $147 million loan from Gamma. Early the next month, Gamma had started foreclosure proceedings on the site, and the Carlton Group sought an $80 million mezzanine loan for the project. Gamma scheduled a foreclosure auction for the site for February 29. Bauhouse asked a judge to enjoin Gamma from foreclosing on the site, but the request was denied on February 23. The following day, JLL sued Bauhouse and Beninati for failing to pay a broker's commission for the two loans the company had secured from Gamma. After failing to secure additional funding, Bauhouse filed for bankruptcy on the 3 Sutton Place site two days before the auction was set to occur, thus canceling the planned auction. Continuing litigation cast the future of the project into doubt. A bankruptcy court hearing took place in April 2016.

Gamma Real Estate takeover 
An auction for the development site was approved in September 2016, and a December auction date was scheduled two months later. Gamma Real Estate acquired the site at auction, and it announced revised plans for the site. Concurrently, efforts to rezone the area proceeded. In April 2017, the initial rezoning proposal was released and was initially met critically. That same month Gamma Real Estate closed on the property.

The rezoning was approved in November, and after an initial decision to grant an exemption was reversed, construction work was halted by the end of the year. At the time, the foundation was nearly completed. Work resumed in June 2018 following approval from the Board of Standards and Appeals, although the project's opponents continued their efforts to halt construction. Construction rose above street level in June 2019 and facade installation began that December. In August 2020, the skyscraper topped-out and facade installation passed the halfway point. The last portions of cladding were installed in June 2021, and by August crown installation was progressing. Completion is estimated by the end of 2021.

References

External links
https://skyscraperpage.com/diagrams/?buildingID=105945
Emporis.com

Midtown Manhattan
Residential skyscrapers in Manhattan
Buildings and structures under construction in the United States